WFKJ is a Christian radio station licensed to Cashtown, Pennsylvania, broadcasting on 890 kHz AM.  The station which only operates during daytime hours serves Adams County, Pennsylvania and is owned by Jesus Is Lord Ministries International. WFKJ's programming consists of Christian talk and teaching along with Christian music, with a portion of its programming from the Oasis Radio Network.

References

External links
WFKJ's official website

FKJ
Radio stations established in 1988
1988 establishments in Pennsylvania
FKJ